Intelsat 903 (or IS-903) is a communications satellite operated by Intelsat.

Launch 
Intelsat 903 was launched by a Proton-K rocket from Baikonur Cosmodrome, Kazakhstan, at 22:27 UTC on March 30, 2002.

Capacity and coverage 
The 4.7 tonne (with fuel) spacecraft carries 23 C-band transponders (and several in Ku-band) to provide direct-to-home television and internet service to Europe and North America after parking over 34.5 degrees west longitude.

See also 
 2002 in spaceflight

External links 
 . Intelsat

References 

Intelsat satellites